Oriol Jorge Graells (born May 23, 1990 in Lleida) is a Spanish professional basketball player. He currently plays for Plus Pujol Lleida of the Spanish LEB Oro.

Honours 

Plus Pujol Lleida

LEB Catalan League Champion: 1
2008

References

1990 births
Living people
Sportspeople from Lleida
Point guards
Spanish men's basketball players